Amblygonite is a fluorophosphate mineral, composed of lithium, sodium, aluminium, phosphate, fluoride and hydroxide. The mineral occurs in pegmatite deposits and is easily mistaken for albite and other feldspars. Its density, cleavage and flame test for lithium are diagnostic. Amblygonite forms a series with montebrasite, the low fluorine endmember. Geologic occurrence is in granite pegmatites, high-temperature tin veins, and greisens. Amblygonite occurs with spodumene, apatite, lepidolite, tourmaline, and other lithium-bearing minerals in pegmatite veins.  It contains about 10% lithium, and has been utilized as a source of lithium. The chief commercial sources have historically been the deposits of California and France.

History
The mineral was first discovered in Saxony by August Breithaupt in 1817, and named by him from the Greek amblus, blunt, and gonia, angle, because of the obtuse angle between the cleavages. Later it was found at Montebras, Creuse, France, and at Hebron in Maine; and because of slight differences in optical character and chemical composition the names montebrasite and hebronite have been applied to the mineral from these localities.  It has been discovered in considerable quantity at Pala in San Diego county, California;  Caceres, Spain; and the Black Hills of South Dakota. The largest documented single crystal of amblygonite measured 7.62×2.44×1.83 m3 and weighed about 102 tons.

Gemology
Transparent amblygonite has been faceted and used as a gemstone. As a gemstone set into jewelry it is vulnerable to breakage and abrasion from general wear, as its hardness and toughness are poor. The main sources for gem material are Brazil and the United States. Australia, France, Germany, Namibia, Norway, and Spain have also produced gem quality amblygonite.

See also 
 List of minerals

References

 Klein, Cornelis and Hurlbut, Cornelius S., 1985, Manual of Mineralogy, 20th ed., p. 362, 
Mindat with location data
Webmineral data
Mineral Galleries

Sodium minerals
Lithium minerals
Aluminium minerals
Phosphate minerals
Triclinic minerals
Minerals in space group 2
Gemstones